This is a list of Los Angeles Historic-Cultural Monuments in the Harbor area of the city of Los Angeles, California, in the United States. There are more than 25 Los Angeles Historic-Cultural Monuments (LAHCM) in this area, and several additional sites have been designated as California Historical Landmarks (CHL) or listed on the National Register of Historic Places (NRHP). They are designated by the City's Cultural Heritage Commission.

Overview of the Harbor Area's Historic-Cultural Monuments

The Harbor Area includes some of the city's most historic sites, several of which are also listed on the National Register of Historic Places.  Two ships located in San Pedro have also received higher distinction as National Historic Landmarks.  They are the Ralph Scott, a fireboat used for several decades by the Los Angeles Fire Department, and the Lane Victory, a World War II Victory ship.

The first sites in the Harbor area to be designated as HCM monuments were both built during the Civil War on land owned by Phinneas Banning.  They are HCM #21 (the Civil War era Drum Barracks) and HCM #25 (Banning House where Phinneas Banning lived until his death).

The harbor has played an important role in the area's military history.  San Pedro is the site of Fort MacArthur, which was established as a military reservation in 1888, and the harbor's historic sites include a Civil War-era barracks (Drum Barracks) and powder magazine (Powder Magazine (Camp Drum)), coastal artillery batteries built during World War I (Battery Osgood-Farley and Battery John Barlow and Saxton), and the flying bridge of a World War II heavy cruiser (the USS Los Angeles).

Many of the Harbor area's historical sites have been converted to museums that are open to the public, including Banning House, Drum Barracks, the Point Fermin Lighthouse, and the old San Pedro Municipal Ferry Building  which now operates as the city-owned Los Angeles Maritime Museum.  The hillside overlooking the Point Fermin Lighthouse also include impressive artillery bunkers used between World War I and World War II, and the Korean Bell of Friendship, donated by the Republic of Korea for U.S. Bicentennial in 1976.  Though located a short distance outside the city limits, Lloyd Wright's Wayfarers Chapel is located a short distance north of Point Fermin.

The Los Angeles Conservancy offers bimonthly walking tours of the historic sites in downtown San Pedro, which includes access to the interiors of the area's historic structures.

Historic-Cultural Monuments in the Harbor area

Non-HCM sites also recognized
The LAHCM sites listed above include many of the most important historic sites in the City of Los Angeles' port area.  Some others within L.A. in the area have been listed on the National Register of Historic Places, including the SS Lane Victory, a U.S. National Historic Landmark.  These are:

There are at least 15 other historic sites in the port area of Long Beach, California, including the RMS Queen Mary.  For these, see National Register of Historic Places listings in Los Angeles County, California.

See also

Lists of L.A. Historic-Cultural Monuments
 Historic-Cultural Monuments in Downtown Los Angeles
 Historic-Cultural Monuments on the East and Northeast Sides

 Historic-Cultural Monuments in Hollywood
 Historic-Cultural Monuments in the San Fernando Valley
 Historic-Cultural Monuments in Silver Lake, Angelino Heights, and Echo Park
 Historic-Cultural Monuments in South Los Angeles
 Historic-Cultural Monuments on the Westside
 Historic-Cultural Monuments in the Wilshire and Westlake areas

Other
 City of Los Angeles' Historic Preservation Overlay Zones
 National Register of Historic Places listings in Los Angeles
 National Register of Historic Places listings in Los Angeles County
 List of California Historical Landmarks
 List of City of Long Beach historic landmarks

References

Further reading

External links
 official Designated L.A. Historic-Cultural Monuments (LAHCM) website — with 'ever-updated' LAHCM list via PDF link.
 Los Angeles HCM Report for the Harbor area — L.A. Planning Department. 
 City of Los Angeles Map, with community districts. — via Given Place Media.
 Big Orange Landmarks:  "Exploring the Landmarks of Los Angeles, One Monument at a Time" — online photos and in-depth history of L.A.H.C. Monuments homepage, see "Landmarks by Community Planning Area" Harbor area links.  — website curator: Floyd B. Bariscale.

 
Harbor
Harbor
Los Angeles-related lists